Bonny Light Horseman is an American folk band consisting of Anaïs Mitchell, Eric D. Johnson (Fruit Bats, The Shins), and Josh Kaufman (The National, Hiss Golden Messenger, Josh Ritter). They released their debut eponymous album in January 2020. Their second album, Rolling Golden Holy, came out in October 2022.

Background 

The band first came together at the Eaux Claires festival in 2018 when invited by the festival's co-founders Justin Vernon (of Bon Iver) and Aaron Dessner (of The National). From the early sessions for this performance, the trio decided to form the band in a more official capacity. Their self-titled debut album was released on January 25, 2020. The album contains a mixture of traditional British folk songs and original material. It was subsequently nominated for the Grammy Award for Best Folk Album.

In 2021 the band was inter alia part of the Newport Folk Festival in July. They also received the Libera Awards Best Americana Record 2021 for their self-named album by A2IM (the American Association of Independent Music).

In December 2021, the band announced in UNCUT Magazine that their second album would be coming in 2022. Mitchell described it as having "a little more of an American feeling on this album." The album was met with similar reviews as to their debut, but American Songwriter noted that this album had a bit more pop in its orientation.

Discography

Studio albums

Singles

Awards and nominations

References

External links 
 

Folk music supergroups
American folk musical groups
Musical groups established in 2019
Musical groups from Washington (state)
2019 establishments in the United States